Kerstin Garefrekes (born 4 September 1979) is a German former footballer who played as a striker or midfielder .

Career

Club
Garefrekes began her career in 1986 at her local football club Grün-Weiß Steinbeck, before joining DJK Arminia Ibbenbüren. In 1998, she moved to the newly founded Bundesliga side FFC Heike Rheine. Garefrekes was relegated to the second division with Heike Rheine in 1999, but achieved immediate promotion back to the Bundesliga the following season. With 26 goals, she won the 2003–04 Bundesliga top scorer award.

In 2004, Garefrekes transferred to 1. FFC Frankfurt, where she claimed several major titles. She won the Bundesliga trophy and the German Cup title three times each. During the 2005–06 and 2007–08 seasons, Garefrekes also won the UEFA Women's Cup at Frankfurt.

Following the departure of Nadine Angerer from Frankfurt, Garefrekes became the new captain of her squad.

International

Garefrekes made her debut for German national team in November 2001 in against the Netherlands. Two years later, she won her first major international title at the 2003 FIFA Women's World Cup. She was an important player for the team, starting in five of the team's six matches and scoring four goals. Garefrekes scored Germany's first and ultimately decisive goal in the semi-final win over the United States. She went on to win the bronze medal at the 2004 Summer Olympics and the title at the 2005 European Championship. In qualifying for the UEFA Women's Euro 2009, she scored a number of goals, including a hat-trick in Germany's 7–0 defeat of Switzerland.

During Germany's successful title defence at the 2007 FIFA Women's World Cup, Garefrekes was part of the team's starting line-up in all of the six matches. She scored twice, including the opener in the quarter-final victory against North Korea. Garefrekes again claimed bronze at the 2008 Summer Olympics and won the European Championship for a second time in 2009. She has been called up for Germany's 2011 FIFA Women's World Cup squad. A few months before the start of the World Cup, she scored a hat trick in a friendly match against Nigeria. Following the tournament she retired from international play.

Honours

Club
1. FFC Frankfurt
 UEFA Women's Champions League: 2005–06, 2007–08, 2014–15
 Bundesliga: 2004–05, 2006–07, 2007–08
 Frauen DFB-Pokal: 2006–07, 2007–08, 2010–11, 2010–14

Germany
 FIFA World Cup: 2003, 2007 
 UEFA European Championship: 2005, 2009
 Olympic bronze medal: 2004, 2008
 Algarve Cup: 2006

Individual
 Bundesliga top scorer: 2003–04
Silbernes Lorbeerblatt: 2007
 FIFA Women's World Cup All Star Team: 2011

References

External links 

 Profile at the German Football Federation  
 
 

1979 births
Living people
People from Ibbenbüren
Sportspeople from Münster (region)
German women's footballers
Germany women's international footballers
2003 FIFA Women's World Cup players
2007 FIFA Women's World Cup players
Footballers at the 2004 Summer Olympics
Footballers at the 2008 Summer Olympics
Olympic bronze medalists for Germany
FFC Heike Rheine players
1. FFC Frankfurt players
FIFA Century Club
Olympic medalists in football
2011 FIFA Women's World Cup players
Medalists at the 2008 Summer Olympics
FIFA Women's World Cup-winning players
Women's association football midfielders
Women's association football forwards
Washington Spirit players
Medalists at the 2004 Summer Olympics
National Women's Soccer League players
Frauen-Bundesliga players
Olympic footballers of Germany
UEFA Women's Championship-winning players
Footballers from North Rhine-Westphalia
German expatriate sportspeople in the United States